David Fa'otusia Veikune (born December 12, 1985) is a former  American football defensive end. Previously played for the Saskatchewan Roughriders of the Canadian Football League. He was drafted by the Cleveland Browns in the second round of the 2009 NFL Draft. He played college football at Hawaii.

He has also played for the Denver Broncos.

Early years
Veikune played high school football at Campbell High School in 'Ewa Beach, Hawai'i. As a senior, he posted 92 tackles, 26 tfl's and 16.5 sacks. He was named 1st team by the Star Bulletin and the Honolulu Advertiser.

College career

Colorado
He started his career at the University of Colorado at Boulder where he was redshirted in 2004.

Fresno City College
He transferred to Fresno City College where he spent a year. He earned All-Northern California honorable mention.

Hawaii
Later he transferred to the University of Hawaii at Manoa where he saw action as a special teamer and as backup in 2006. In 2007, Veikune was named a 1st team ALL-WAC Selection even though he never started a game. He led the WAC in sacks with seven (pre-bowl). In 2008, Veikune earned a 2nd team ALL-WAC Selection after he was the team’s third leading tackler with 73 and was among the WAC’s leaders with 16.5 tackles for loss and nine sacks. He played Defensive Tackle and Defensive End at Hawaii. He also had 11 quarterback hurries and forced four fumbles.

He was invited to play in the 2009 Senior Bowl to play for the South Team.

Professional career

Pre-draft

Cleveland Browns
Veikune was drafted by the Cleveland Browns in the second round (52nd overall) of the 2009 NFL Draft.  He was taken one pick before Pro Bowler LeSean McCoy, although the Browns were already starting Jamal Lewis at tailback. The pick was acquired from the New York Jets in an earlier trade that allowed the Jets to draft quarterback Mark Sanchez.

Veikune appeared in 10 games on kick return as a rookie. He tore his mcl on the last practice of the year and was placed on season-ending injured reserve on January 2, 2010.

Veikune was waived by the Browns on September 7, 2010.

Denver Broncos
On November 17, 2010, Veikune signed with the Denver Broncos and was a top special team player for the remaining 2010 season. He was waived the following season on August 29, 2011.

Saskatchewan Roughriders
On November 3, 2011, it was announced that Veikune had signed with the Saskatchewan Roughriders.

On May 31, 2013, Veikune was released by the Riders before training camp started because he had a high ankle sprain that wouldn't heal until the end of the season.

Los Angeles Kiss
On October 1, 2013, Veikune was assigned to the expansion Los Angeles Kiss of the Arena Football League.

References

External links
Saskatchewan Roughriders bio
Cleveland Browns bio
Hawaii Warriors bio

1985 births
Living people
American people of Tongan descent
Players of American football from Anchorage, Alaska
Players of American football from Honolulu
American football defensive ends
American football linebackers
Colorado Buffaloes football players
Hawaii Rainbow Warriors football players
Cleveland Browns players
Denver Broncos players
Saskatchewan Roughriders players
Fresno City Rams football players
Los Angeles Kiss players